Henry II (18 April 1503 – 25 May 1555), nicknamed Sangüesino because he was born at Sangüesa, was the King of Navarre from 1517, although his kingdom had been reduced to a small territory north of the Pyrenees by the Spanish conquest of 1512. Henry succeeded his mother, Queen Catherine, upon her death. His father was her husband and co-ruler, King John III, who died of fever in 1516.

King of Navarre
After the latest failed reconquest attempt of Navarre in 1516, John III died, followed by Catherine I's demise in her independent dependencies of Béarn (1517). Heir apparent Henry was proclaimed King of Navarre, and was lavishly crowned in Lescar. The title was also claimed by Ferdinand II of Aragon, who had invaded the realm in 1512 and usurped the title, and the claim was continued by his grandson Charles V. Henry II enjoyed the protection of Francis I of France.

Henry II was thirteen when becoming King in February 1517, and his sister Anne of Navarre functioned as his regent until he became fifteen and was declared of legal majority on 18 April 1518. As Henry was often absent from Navarre, his sister Anne continued to act as his regent there when he was absent. 

After ineffectual conferences at Noyon in 1516 and at Montpellier in 1518, an active effort was made in 1521 to establish him in de facto sovereignty in Pamplona and occupied territory. A French and Navarrese expedition made another attempt at reconquering occupied Navarre, but were ultimately repelled by Charles after the Battle of Noain (June 1521).

In 1525, Henry was taken prisoner at the Battle of Pavia, but he contrived to escape under a guise and in 1526, married Margaret, sister of King Francis I and widow of Charles, Duke of Alençon. In 1530, after the Treaty of Cambrai between Castile and France, Charles V evacuated the northernmost county (merindad) of Navarre, Lower Navarre, allowing Henry to seize it. The Pyrenean border between Lower and Upper Navarre now constitutes the Franco-Spanish border in this sector.

Henry had some strong sympathy with the Huguenots, and was fluent in both French and Spanish, according to the seigneur de Brantôme. He died at Hagetmau on 25 May 1555.

Marriage
In 1526, he married Margaret of Angoulême who became known as Marguerite de Navarre (11 April 1492 – 21 December 1549) and had issue:
 Jeanne III of Navarre (16 November 1528 – 9 June 1572); mother of Henry IV of France
 John (7 July 1530 – 25 December 1530)

Ancestry

References

Sources

|-

1503 births
1555 deaths
16th-century Princes of Andorra
16th-century Navarrese monarchs
Counts of Bigorre
Counts of Évreux
Counts of Foix
Dukes of Albret
Modern child monarchs
Viscounts of Béarn
Burials at Lescar Cathedral